Maharajawas is a village in Alwar district in Rajasthan state in India. The literal meaning of the name is "Residence of Great King". It is nearly 10 km from Behror.

Villages in Alwar district